D38, D 38 or D-38 may refer to:

Ships 
 , a Mato Grosso-class destroyer of the Brazilian Navy
 , a Perth-class destroyer of the Royal Australian Navy
 , a destroyer of the Royal Navy
 , a Ruler-class escort carrier of the Royal Navy

Other uses 
 Akaflieg Darmstadt D-38, a German sailplane
 Cameron D-38, a British airship
 D38 road (Croatia)
 Depleted uranium
 D38, a 1980s Dicomed color workstation